David Mitchell (born 16 September 1981 in Bellshill) is a male field hockey defender from Scotland. He plays club hockey for Motherwell HC, and made his debut for the Men's National Team in 2001. Mitchell is engaged to Scottish international hockey player, Julie Kilpatrick.

References
 sportscotland

1981 births
Living people
Scottish male field hockey players
Field hockey players at the 2006 Commonwealth Games
Sportspeople from Bellshill
Commonwealth Games competitors for Scotland